U.S. Route 76 (US 76) is an east–west U.S. Highway in the state of Tennessee. Its route is almost entirely in Chattanooga.

Route description
US 76 begins at an intersection with US 41/US 72/SR 17 (Broad Street) in downtown Chattanooga. It goes east, running concurrently with US 41/SR 17 (as Main Street) through some industrial areas, where SR 8 (Market Street) joins the concurrency, before entering suburbs and coming to an intersection with South Willow Street, where SR 17 splits off and goes north. US 41/US 76/SR 8 then comes to an intersection with US 11/US 64/SR 2 (Dodds Avenue), where they turn south to run concurrently with those three highways for a short distance before US 11/US 64/SR 2 turns east onto East 23rd Avenue while US 41/US 76/SR 8 turnss southeast onto Westside Drive and an interchange with I-24 (exit 181A). The highway then turns east again and passes through the Bachman Tubes, leaving Chattanooga and entering the City of East Ridge. It travels through the city and then meets an interchange with I-75 (exit 1) before entering Georgia, where SR 8 ends and US 41/US 76 runs concurrently with SR 3, which begins here. The entire route of US 76 in Tennessee is in Hamilton County and is concurrent with US 41 and SR 8.

History

Major intersections

See also

References

External links

 
76
Transportation in Hamilton County, Tennessee